Stephen Dennis Surridge (born 17 July 1970) is the founder of Forbury (Commercial Real Estate Property Valuations Software) and also a former New Zealand rugby union player.

Education 
Surridge received his Engineering degree from the University of Auckland in 1992 and then completed a postgraduate diploma in Manufacturing Management at the University of Cambridge in the UK in 1996. From 2000 to 2003 in Sydney, he gained a postgraduate diploma in finance and investment from the Securities Institute of Australia.

Career

Rugby career 
A number 8, Surridge represented Auckland and Canterbury at a provincial level and the in Super Rugby. He was a member of the New Zealand national side, the All Blacks, on the 1997 tour of Ireland, Wales and England, playing in three matches but no internationals. By the time he finished in top rugby Steve had played 29 Super 12 matches for the Crusaders and 28 matches for Canterbury. He had a leading role in the NPC first division title win in 1997 and was in the Crusaders in the Super 12 championship wins of 1998–99.

Business career 
From 2002 to 2007, Surridge spent five years of his professional career working with Ernst & Young as a financial modeling consultant. From 2008 to 2016, Steve pursued a corporate career and became the Chief Financial Officer for the New Zealand companies Solid Energy and Tait Communications.

Surridge starting developing a customised valuation tools for major players in the commercial real estate industry in Australasia. This work highlighted a common need in commercial real estate investment tools and resulted in the development of a bespoke solution for property valuation, which led to the formation of Forbury in 2003.

References

1970 births
Living people
Rugby union players from Auckland
University of Auckland alumni
Alumni of Wolfson College, Cambridge
Auckland rugby union players
Canterbury rugby union players
Crusaders (rugby union) players
New Zealand rugby union players
New Zealand international rugby union players
New Zealand expatriate sportspeople in Japan
Expatriate rugby union players in Japan
People educated at Saint Kentigern College
Rugby union number eights